Chinese float-on/float-off ship Zhenhua 33 (Revitalize China 33) is a military/civilian dual use semi-submersible ship (AKF) built in the People’s Republic of China (PRC) for the People's Liberation Army Navy (PLAN).

The ship is operated by civilians during peacetime for commercial operations, and when activated, the ship will come under PLAN control. The ship is 227 meters long and with a 43 meter beam, displacing 50,000 tons.The draft is 10 meters, but is increased to 27 meters when submerged. The total deck area is 7,700 square meters. Four diesel engine generators produce the electrical power for propulsion, giving the ship a speed of 14 knots and a range of 18,000 nautical miles.
Specification: 
Length: 227 m
Beam: 43 m
Draft: 10 m, 27 m when submerged
Displacement: 50000 ton
Speed: 14 kt
Endurance: 18000 nm

Reference

Auxiliary ships of the People's Liberation Army Navy